Taniela Likuʻohihifo Fusimalohi is a Tongan politician and civil servant.

Fusimalohi was educated at the University of South Australia, graduated with a Bachelor of Business Studies. After completing a postgraduate diploma at the University of Manchester in the United Kingdom, he returned to the University of South Australia to complete a Master of Arts. In 2005 he completed a PhD at the University of Queensland on the topic of  Culture-bound public administration : the value basis of public administration in Tonga.

From 1987 Fusimalohi worked as a civil servant, starting as a Senior Executive Officer in the Prime Minister's Office and rising to be a Principal Assistant Secretary. In 2000 he was appointed Deputy Director of the Tonga Visitors Bureau. From 2007 to 2012 he served as Chief Executive of the Ministry of Training, Employment, Youth and Sports. In 2020 he was appointed as a Part Time Commissioner of the Public Service Commission.

He was elected to the seat of ʻEua 11 in the 2021 Tongan general election.

References

Living people
Members of the Legislative Assembly of Tonga
Tongan civil servants
University of South Australia alumni
Alumni of the University of Manchester
University of Queensland alumni
Year of birth missing (living people)